Bussa is a genus of butterflies in the family Lycaenidae. This name is preoccupied (see Thylacoptila) and replaced by Brevianta.

Lycaenidae
Lycaenidae genera